Literature Alive is a multi-faceted educational project, produced by the Toronto-based multimedia company CaribbeanTales and its sister company Leda Serene Films, that explores the work of Caribbean-Canadian authors. It comprises a documentary series (commissioned for Bravo! Canada and first broadcast in October 2005), a series of audio books, a website and a radio series for the CBC.

Literature Alive! Second Life is a program in the multi-user virtual environment Second Life used to disseminate instruction in the humanities in a 3D environment.

External links
 Literature Alive web site
 Literature Alive at Bravo!

Caribbean-Canadian culture in Ontario
Multimedia works